Larva (also known as Larvae) is a computer-animated television series made by TUBA Entertainment in Seoul, South Korea. This cartoon shows two larvae as its main characters. There’s no dialogue in the show: characters either do not speak, except Chuck, Grace and other human characters.

Characters

Main 
 Yellow - is a dense, dirty and happy-go-lucky yellow-colored caterpillar with an antenna. Yellow is often abused by Red, but that never endangers their friendship. Although usually he obeys Red, he loses his mind in front of food. Yellow is bad with Red because he takes all things that are for Red and Red always fights him. He changes color from yellow to brown and he grows dark green shades around his mouth when feeling extreme emotions.
 Red – is a mostly hot-tempered and greedy red-colored caterpillar. He is often seen hurting Yellow, Red usually ends up hurting himself instead. He usually shrieks, shouts and screams when in anger, fear, frustration and in a horrible panic.

Recurring 
 Violet – An oversized ghost slug. He has an exposed inner body and roar, showing his sharp teeth.
 Brown – An anthropomorphic dung beetle that gathers dung. To him, dung is a treasure, though it makes his breath stink. He hates it when other insects touch his dungball. He has a long strand of hair on his right cheek.
 Black – A horned Atlas beetle that has great strength and is usually punching a cocoon (which he uses as punching bag). He's aggressive and will beat up whoever he thinks is messing with him. In "Black’s Back" he turns out to be a slug wearing beetle armor.
 Rainbow – A lazy snail with a red and green shell. When in his shell, he moves slowly, but under that, he has a muscular human-like body and can function as humans do.
 Pink – A pink-colored caterpillar with two antennae. She loves Yellow and Yellow loves her as well, but her presence often causes conflict between him and Red, who has a one-sided crush on her. She hides a great strength behind her cute, beautiful face.
 Ivory - A stick bug with brown skin, Ivory has a very thin body with brown skin color. He has black eyes and darker colored areas by his eyelids. He has 2 antennae and little pink studs on. His girlfriend is Cocoa.

Minor 
 Blue – A housefly that has numerous smells. Nobody can get close because of his repugnant smell. He often feels gloomy and lonely because nobody can approach him.
 Navy – A deep-sea fish appears when the sewerage is sunk. He appeared as a goldfish. When Red and Yellow threw him into a sardine can full of warm water, he changed into a deep-sea fish which is often seen whenever the sewer floods. He has a good enough appetite to eat up the caterpillars and other insects.
 Venus flytrap – A carnivorous plant which eats up anything on the ground. In season 1, he is an enemy to all insects because he tries to swallow the other insects when he encounters them. But he is weaker than Violet. He appears to have a menacing set of teeth.
 Green – A frog which often appears in the sewer, is sensitive, and tries to monopolize all power by eating insects and larvae. He is several times bigger than other normal frogs. He escaped from the sewer and went into the house where Red and Yellow lived in season 2. In season 3, he lives on the streets along with Grey & the Silvers.
 Bee – A honey bee which collects honey. She stings when someone touches the honey that she collected or makes her angry.
 Maroon – A dachshund who wears a blue and yellow sweater, appearing in season 2. He attacks when he sees moving things. He buries his valued bones in the ground and is quite temperamental. In "Whistle", he does certain things when he hears certain whistling.
 Prussian – A blue parrot which appears in season 2. He observes other friends and gives a sardonic laugh before attacking. He is also a predator to the caterpillars. "Nanta" revealed that he used to live in the Amazon rainforest as a hatchling.
 Prism – A chameleon which appears intermittently in various areas of season 2, such as the living room, bathroom, rooftop, and even bedroom; he suddenly appears and attacks Red and Yellow without reason.
 Ephemera – A mayfly who appears in the titular episode. Red has a crush on her, but she dies quickly due to the lifespan of an average mayfly.
 Bomber bug –  A bombardier beetle which bombed Yellow, Red, and Brown in the episode "Bomb Bug" in Season 2. He has the ability to bomb a place with acid which comes out from his bottom. He usually does that when he's angry, sad, or feeling disgusted.
 Grey – A rat that appears in season 3. He is an enemy to all caterpillars in this season.
 Silvers – A bird duo using food scraps (a banana peel and a carved-out half watermelon) to protect their super reflective heads from the sun, they are enemies of the larvae. Each bird communicates with one word, "Yah" for the bird wearing the banana peel, and "Huh" for the bird wearing the carved out watermelon. These birds only appear in Season 3.
 Cocoa - A house cricket that Ivory's girlfriend.
 Mite  - A baby mite who Yellow initially adopts, but turns out to parasitically prey on Yellow and the others. Then Yellow leaves it in a zoo. 
 Mud - A mudskipper. They live underground under the sands and can slap each other with their fins.
 Booby - A Blue footed booby bird. He met the larvae when they landed on his island.
 Mango - A caterpillar Red has fallen in love with. When she first meets Red, she couples with him.
 Chuck - A human. He is the first character who can speak properly, although previously other characters occasionally spoke on occasion if it fits the scene.
 Clara - A seal that Red and Yellow befriended. She is playful and charming and has the same name as Chuck's girlfriend.
 Whale - A whale who appears in season 4.
 Crabsformer - A crab that accidentally ate an unknown object that turned him into a robotic crab. He has a crush on a lady crab, however, she and the other crabs are scared of his powers. This character appears in season 4.
 Malt - A dark grey tabby & the assistant of the bald bug capturing scientist who plans to use the captured bugs for his invention that uses bugs to create a hair-growth solution to restore his hair. He first debuts in Larva Pendant.

Production 
Larva was launched by TUBA Entertainment in 2011, with adult viewers in mind. The producers aimed to create a cartoon that could appeal to an audience of a wide age scale. It debuted on the national channel, KBS and on cable television with short, 90-second episodes. The series quickly became popular, and as of September 2015 was sold to more than 40 countries, including Canal Plus in France, as well as merchandising contracts taking place in Taiwan, Germany, Turkey and Chile, among others. The creators earned 1 million dollars in royalties in the first three months of launching related merchandise, including toys and stationery products.

Episode list

Series overview 
<onlyinclude>

Netflix films

The Larva Island Movie 
The Larva Island Movie is an animated Netflix film that serves as the canonical finale to the Larva franchise. The film focuses on Chuck, who has returned to civilization long after the events of "Drift", telling the events of the final season to a reporter named Grace. The film was released in Jul 24, 2020.

Larva Pendant 
Larva Pendant is 2022 animated short film that is set between the final season and The Larva Island Movie. Larva Pendant explains how Red and Yellow returned to the sewer, as they were seen coming out of their can in the final scene of previous film without an initial explanation after the events of "Drift". The short film was released May 25, 2022.

Reception 
Emily Ashby from the organization Common Sense Media rated Larva three stars. She praised the show for showing the perspective of Red and Yellow, stating "because the characters are the size of worms, everything around them is larger than life, and that perspective is always fun to see in action." Issac Butler of Slate described Larva as "the most terrifying show on Netflix" and mocked its excessive toilet humor in a tongue-in-cheek article. Ivan Lin of Asia First Media recognized the characters' innovative contributions in educational videos.

References

External links 
 
 
2010s black comedy television series
2010s South Korean animated television series
2011 South Korean television series debuts
2019 South Korean television series endings
South Korean children's animated comedy television series
Korean Broadcasting System original programming
Animated television series without speech
Korean-language Netflix original programming
South Korean animated films